Tom Sayers is a sound editor. He was nominated at the 81st Academy Awards in the category of Best Sound Editing for the film Slumdog Millionaire. He shared his nomination with Glenn Freemantle.

Selected filmography

Cinderella (2015)
Dark Shadows (2012)
Gnomeo & Juliet (2011)
An Education (2009)
Slumdog Millionaire (2008)
Bridget Jones's Diary (2001)
Wing Commander (1999)

References

External links
 

British sound editors
Living people
Year of birth missing (living people)
Best Sound BAFTA Award winners